The 2008 TPG Tour was the second season of the TPG Tour, the main professional golf tour in Argentina since it was established in 2007.

Seven events were also part of the Tour de las Américas, the highest level tour in Latin America. The Abierto Visa del Centro and the Abierto Visa de la República were also co-sanctioned by the Challenge Tour. The Torneo de Maestros was also co-sanctioned by the Canadian Tour.

The Order of Merit was won by Estanislao Goya, who also topped the 2008 Tour de las Américas standings, despite only winning one tournament. Andrés Romero was second, having claimed two titles, with Rafael Gómez finishing third with three victories during the course of season.

Schedule
The following table lists official events during the 2008 season.

Notes

References

Golf in Argentina
TPG Tour
TPG Tour